Eduard Vieta Pascual is a Spanish psychiatrist and a leading scientific authority on the neurobiology and treatment of bipolar disorder.

Education 
Eduard Vieta was born in Barcelona, Spain. He studied medicine at the Autonomous University of Barcelona and graduated in 1987. He did his residency training at the Hospital Clinic of Barcelona and became a specialist in Psychiatry in 1991. He subsequently received his PhD with honors at the University of Barcelona in 1994.

Career

Research focus/interests
Vieta's research interests include the neurobiology and treatment of bipolar disorders. His work focuses on new pharmacological and psychological treatments and the effects of psycho-education and the other psychotherapeutic methods in the treatment of bipolar disorder and to the development of novel pharmacological treatments and psychotherapies such as Psychoeducation and Functional Remediation for bipolar disorder.

Notable contributions to research
Vieta has made contributions to many of the published bipolar disorder treatment guidelines. By the number of citations, he is the most cited author of a number of psychology journals: Journal of Affective Disorders, Psychotherapy and Psychosomatics, Bipolar Disorders an International Journal of Psychiatry and Neurosciences, Journal of Clinical Psychiatry.

Awards
Vieta has received the following awards:
 Aristotle Award (2005) 
 Mogens Schou Award (2007) 
 Strategic Research Award of the Spanish Society of Biological Psychiatry (2009)
 Official College of Physicians Award for Professional Excellence (2011)
 Colvin Prize for Outstanding Achievement in Mood Disorders Research by the Brain & Behavior Research Foundation (2012)  
 Clinical Neuroscience Lilly Award by the International College of Neuropsychopharmacology (CINP, 2014) 
 Doctor Honoris Causa by the University of Valencia.

Present appointments
Vieta is Professor of Psychiatry at the University of Barcelona, Catalonia, Spain, where he heads the Bipolar Disorders Program, a worldwide leader in the clinical care, research and teaching of bipolar disorders  and Head of the Psychiatry Unit at the Hospital Clínic de Barcelona. Vieta is also the Director of the Bipolar Research Program at the Spanish Research Network on Mental Diseases (CIBERSAM), funded by the Spanish Ministry of Economy and Competitiveness, and director of the Bipolar Disorder Group of the Neuroscience Area of Institut d'Investigacions Biomèdiques August Pi i Sunyer (IDIBAPS), as well as Treasurer of the European College of Neuropsychopharmacology (ECNP).

Positions of trust/research assessments
Vieta is the current Treasurer of the 2013-16 Executive Committee of the European College of Neuropsychopharmacology (ECNP).
 
He is on the editorial board of a range of international scientific journals including the American Journal of Psychiatry, The Lancet Psychiatry, Psychotherapy Psychosomatics, the International Journal of Neuropsychopharmacology, European Neuropsychopharmacology, the Journal of Clinical Psychiatry, Bipolar Disorders, and the Journal of Affective Disorders. He was nominated as the official advisor on mood disorders research to the European Presidency. He has served as visiting professor at McLean Hospital and Harvard University.

Publications
Vieta has published more than 600 articles, 370 book chapters, and 32 books. He is on the editorial board of 18 scientific journals and regularly reviews articles for many others. His H index is 77 and has over 22593 citations (Scopus), which makes him the most cited scientist  worldwide in the field of bipolar disorder over the last 5 years and one of the world's most influential scientific minds, according to Thompson Reuters.

References

External links 
“European College of Neuropsychopharmacology”
“Hospital Clínic de Barcelona”
“CIBERSAM”

1963 births
Living people
Spanish psychiatrists
Academic staff of the University of Barcelona
People from Barcelona